Flaxcombe is a village in the Canadian province of Saskatchewan within the Rural Municipality of Kindersley No. 290 and Census Division No. 13. The village is located approximately 30 km west of the Town of Kindersley, on Highway 7, and approximately 27 km east of the Alberta-Saskatchewan border.

History 
Flaxcombe incorporated as a village on June 4, 1913.

Demographics 

See also 

 List of communities in Saskatchewan
 Villages of Saskatchewan

References

Villages in Saskatchewan
Kindersley No. 290, Saskatchewan
Division No. 13, Saskatchewan